The Battle of Stalingrad is a 1949 two-part Soviet war film about the Battle of Stalingrad, directed by Vladimir Petrov. The script was written by Nikolai Virta.

Plot

Film I
In the Kremlin, Stalin analyzes the Wehrmacht's movements and concludes that the Germans aim to capture Stalingrad. Hitler, who believes the city is the key to final victory, orders his generals take it at all costs.

As the enemy approaches Stalingrad, the Red Army and the local population rally to defend it in bitter house-to-house combat, stalling the German advance. In Moscow, Stalin plans the counter-offensive.

Film II
The Wehrmacht launches a last, massive assault, intended to overwhelm the defenders of Stalingrad. As the Red Army is pushed back to the Volga, Stalin orders the commencement of Operation Uranus. The German 6th Army is encircled, and efforts to relieve the Stalingrad pocket fail. General Friedrich Paulus, ordered by Hitler to hold to the end, refuses to surrender while his soldiers starve. The Soviets close on the city, battering the German forces as they advance. After Red Army soldiers enter his command post, Paulus orders his remaining troops to surrender. The Soviets hold a victory rally in liberated Stalingrad; in Moscow, Stalin looks at a map, setting his eyes on Berlin.

Production
The film is the last of the 'Artistic Documentaries', a series of propaganda epics that recreated the history of the Second World War with a Stalinist interpretation of the events. Like all of the other films in the genre, The Battle of Stalingrad consists mainly of battle scenes and staff meetings, reconstructing the campaign from the point of view of the soldiers and the generals, in a heroic manner fitting the state's ideology.

Reception
The movie won the Crystal Globe in the 1949 Karlovy Vary Film Festival. Aleksei Dikiy, who portrayed Stalin, received the 1949 Gottwaldov Film Festival's prize, and director Vladimir Petrov won the Czechoslovak Workers' Film Festival Best Director Award. Petrov, cinematographer Yuri Yekelchik and four actors – Aleksei Dikiy, Nikolay Simonov, Yuri Shumsky and Vladimir Gaidarov – were awarded the Stalin Prize at 1950 for their role in the film.

French critic André Bazin wrote that the film portrayed Stalin as a super-human leader, showing him planning the Soviet war effort almost on his own: "Even if we grant Stalin a hyper-Napoleonic military genius... It would be childish to think that events in the Kremlin unfolded as they are seen here." Richard Taylor listed The Battle of Stalingrad as "a personality cult film".

Cast
Aleksei Dikiy – Joseph Stalin
Maksim Shtraukh – Vyacheslav Molotov
Viktor Khokhryakov – Georgy Malenkov
Mikhail Kvarelashvili – Lavrentiy Beria
Nikolai Dorokhin – Nikita Khrushchev
Vladimir Solovyov – Mikhail Kalinin
Yuri Tolubeyev – Andrei Zhdanov
Nikolai Ryzhov – Lazar Kaganovich
Garri Mushegyan – Anastas Mikoyan
Mikhail Derzhavin – Kliment Voroshilov
Yuri Shumsky – General Aleksandr Vasilevsky
Vasili Merkuryev – General Nikolay Voronov
Boris Livanov – General Konstantin Rokossovsky
Nikolai Kolesnikov – General Andrey Yeryomenko
Nikolay Simonov – General Vasily Chuikov
Vasily Orlov – General Nikolay Krylov
Sergei Brzhesky – General Aleksandr Rodimtsev
Nikolai Plotnikov – Commissioner Gurov
Boris Smirnov – Lieutenant Kaleganov
Leonid Knyazev – Sergeant Yakov Pavlov
Vladimir Golovin – General Nikolai Vatutin
Aleksei Krasnopolsky – General Nikolai Trufanov
Mikhail Nazvanov – Colonel Ivan Lyudnikov
Nikolai Kryuchkov – Lieutenant Ivanov
Aleksandr Antonov – Colonel Popov
Nikolay Cherkasov – Franklin D. Roosevelt
Viktor Stanitsyn – Winston Churchill/General Fyodor Tolbukhin
Konstantin Mikhailov – W. Averell Harriman
Mikhail Astangov – Adolf Hitler
Mikhail Garkavi – Hermann Göring
Nikolai Komissarov – Field Marshal Wilhelm Keitel
Boris Svoboda – General Alfred Jodl
Nikolai Rybnikov – Field Marshal Maximilian von Weichs
Vladimir Vsevolodov – General Arthur Schmidt
Vladimir Gaidarov – Field Marshal Friedrich Paulus
Yevgeny Kaluzhsky – General Wilhelm Adam (first film)
Nikolai Nikolayevsky – General Wilhelm Adam (second film)
Vladimir Chernyavsky – General Kurt Zeitzler
Rostislav Plyatt – General Hermann Hoth
Sergei Blinnikov – Alexander Poskrebyshev (uncredited)
Yuri Levitan – Narrator

References

External links
Part I and Part II on the IMDb.
The Battle of Stalingrad on Kino-teatr.ru.
The Battle of Stalingrad original East German posters on ostfilm.de.

Mosfilm films
1940s Russian-language films
Soviet epic films
Soviet biographical films
Soviet historical action films
1948 films
1949 films
Crystal Globe winners
Biographical action films
1940s historical action films
Films about the Battle of Stalingrad
Films about Joseph Stalin
Films scored by Aram Khachaturian
Films released in separate parts
Cultural depictions of Adolf Hitler
Cultural depictions of Franklin D. Roosevelt
Cultural depictions of Lavrentiy Beria
Cultural depictions of Nikita Khrushchev
Cultural depictions of Winston Churchill
Soviet black-and-white films
1940s biographical films
Soviet World War II films
Russian World War II films